Stefan Traub (born 20 March 1969) is a Swiss curler.

At the national level, he is a 2003 Swiss men's champion curler and a 1990 Swiss junior champion curler.

Teams

References

External links

Living people
1969 births
Swiss male curlers
Swiss curling champions
Place of birth missing (living people)